Star 102.7 (ACMA callsign: 4CCA) is an adult contemporary-formatted commercial radio station based in Cairns, Queensland, Australia, and broadcasting to, owned by ARN.

History
Prior to 2009, the station was known as 4CA-FM, and was the second FM station in the market (after 103.5 Hot FM). 4CA-FM was purchased by Prime Media Group Limited in 2005 from Macquarie Regional RadioWorks, and was rebranded as 102.7 Zinc FM on 23 March 2009. At that time, the 4CA branding returned to sister station 4EL.

In August 2013 Grant Broadcasters acquired the station and Prime Media's other nine radio stations in Queensland.

In April 2016 Grant Broadcasters re-branded Zinc 102.7 to Star 102.7  and switched to an adult contemporary format.

Star 102.7 is the #1 Station most listened to in Cairns according to the 2019 Xtra-Insights Radion survey.

According to the 2019 radio ratings, Star 102.7 is the Station most listened to in Cairns.
Dave and Inkie are one of the longest running breakfast teams and #1 in Cairns.

1 Station most listened to in Cairns
1 Breakfast show with Dave and Inkie
1 Morning with CK
1 Afternoon with Juanita
1 Drive with Fitzy&Wippa and Kate Tim and Marty
1 Station most listened to across the workday �#1 Station most listened to across the weekend
�     Star 102.7 boasts the fastest growing audience in       �     Cairns for CUME.

Number of listeners:

Breakfast ( 5:30am-9am): 49,900  
Morning ( 9am-12pm): 22,400  
Afternoon ( 12pm-4pm): 31,600  
Drive ( 4pm-7pm): 33,100  
Evening ( 7pm-12am): 4,400  
Weekend ( Sat-Sun 5:30am-12am): 29,400

In November 2021, Star 102.7, along with other stations owned by Grant Broadcasters, were acquired by the Australian Radio Network. This deal will allow Grant's stations, including Star 102.7, to access ARN's iHeartRadio platform in regional areas. The deal was finalized on January 4, 2022. It is expected Star 102.7 will integrate with ARN's KIIS Network, but will retain its current name according to the press release from ARN.

References

External links
 

Radio stations in Queensland
Australian Radio Network
Hot adult contemporary radio stations in Australia